Allamah Shibli Nomani ( علامہ– ; 3 June 1857 – 18 November 1914) was an Islamic scholar from the Indian subcontinent during the British Raj. He was born at Bindwal in Azamgarh district of present-day Uttar Pradesh. He is known for the founding of the Shibli National College in 1883 and the Darul Mussanifin (House of Writers) in Azamgarh. As a supporter of the Deobandi school, he favoured the inclusion of English Language and European sciences in the system of education. Nomani was a scholar in Arabic, Persian, Turkish and Urdu. He was also a poet. He collected much material on the life of the Islamic Prophet, Muhammad, but could write only the first two volumes of the planned work the Sirat-un-Nabi. His disciple, Sulaiman Nadvi, made use of this material and added to it and also wrote remaining five volumes of the work, the Sirat-un-Nabi after the death of his mentor.

Early life
Nomani was born into a Muslim Rajput family, his ancestor Sheoraj Singh being a Bais who accepted Islam many generations ago,
to Habibullah and Moqeema Khatoon. He was named after Abu-Bakr Al Shibli who was a Sufi saint and a disciple of Junayd Baghdadi. Later in life, he added "Nomani" to his name.

Although his younger brothers went to London, England for education (and later returned, one as a barrister employed at Allahabad High Court), Nomani received a traditional Islamic education.  His teacher was Maulana Muhammad Farooq Chirayakoti, a rationalist scholar who was an outspoken opponent of Sir Syed Ahmed Khan. This aspect of Nomani’s background perhaps explains his ambivalent relationship with Aligarh and Sir Syed. The Chirayakot connection is significant. David Lelyveld notes that Chirayakot was the center of ‘a uniquely rationalist and eclectic school of ulema’, who studied Mu’tazalite theology, the early Arab development of Greek science and philosophy, as well as such languages as Sanskrit and Hebrew.

Nomani therefore had reasons to be both attracted and repelled by Aligarh. Even after he had secured a post as a teacher of Persian and Arabic at Aligarh, he always found the intellectual atmosphere at the college disappointing, and eventually left Aligarh because he found it uncongenial, although he did not officially resign from the college until after Sir Syed’s death in 1898.

In the Middle East
He taught Persian and Arabic languages at Aligarh for sixteen years, where he met Thomas Arnold and other British scholars from whom he learned first-hand modern Western ideas and thoughts. He travelled with Thomas Arnold in 1892 to the Ottoman Empire including Syria, Turkey and Egypt and other locations in the Middle East and got direct and practical experience of their societies. In Istanbul, he received a medal from Sultan Abdul Hamid II. His scholarship influenced Thomas Arnold on one hand, and on the other he was influenced by Thomas Arnold to a great extent, and this explains the modern touch in his ideas. In Cairo, he met noted Islamic scholar Muhammad Abduh (1849-1905).

In Hyderabad and Lucknow
After the death of Sir Syed Ahmed in 1898, he left Aligarh University and became an advisor in the Education Department of Hyderabad State. He initiated many reforms in the Hyderabad education system. From his policy, the Osmania University of Hyderabad adopted Urdu as the medium of instruction. Before that, no other university of India had adopted any vernacular language as the medium of instruction in higher studies. In 1905, he left Hyderabad and went to Lucknow as principal and driving force of the Darul Uloom Nadwatul Ulama, a madrasa founded by the Nadwat tul-'Ulum. He introduced reforms in the school's teaching and curriculum.  He stayed at the school for five years but the orthodox class of scholars became hostile towards him, and he had to leave Lucknow to settle in the area around his hometown, Azamgarh in 1913.

Founding of Darul Mussanifin
Earlier at Nadwa, he had wanted to establish Darul Musannifin or the House of Writers but he could not do this at that time. He bequeathed his bungalow and mango orchard and motivated the members of his clan and relatives to do the same and had succeeded. He wrote letters to his disciples and other eminent persons and sought their co-operation. Eventually one of his disciples, Syed Sulaiman Nadvi fulfilled his dream and established Darul Musannifin at Azamgarh. The first formal meeting of the institution was held on 21 November 1914, within three days of his death.

Nomani’s ideology

Nomani and Syed Ahmed wished for the welfare of Muslims, and wanted to have Western thinking and style come along with it. However, Sir Syed wanted to save the Muslims from the wrath of the British rulers after their active participation in the War of Independence of 1857, called the "Sepoy Mutiny" of 1857 by the British colonialist rulers, whereas, Shibli wanted to make them self-reliant and self-respecting by regaining their lost heritage and tradition.

Aligarh movement
According to some scholars, Shibli was against the Aligarh movement. He opposed the ideology of Sir Syed and that is why he was debarred from the services of Muhammadan Anglo-Oriental College. Kamleshwar wrote a novel 'Kitne Pakistan' (How Many Pakistan?) and in that novel he portrays Nomani as a narrow-minded Muslim theologian. In another book, 'Ataturk Fi Karbala by Arif ul Islam',  the author alleged that Shibli was not happy with Sir Syed's policies and ideologies and was involved vehemently against Aligarh movement.

Legacy and survivors
Nomani had two daughters, Rabia Khatoon and Jannutul Fatima, and one son, Hamid Hassan Nomani. This son was born in 1882 and died in 1942. He had another son who died soon after birth, and five daughters.

They are: 
 Naseem Jehan, retired director of health, Bangladesh, died in Karachi in 1994. She was married in 1940 to Dr Zafrul Huda of Dhaka University. He died in 1978 at Dhaka. They have one daughter.
 Shamim Jehan (died in Karachi in 2005), married in 1940 to Ehtesham Ahmed, who died in 1982. They have eight sons and seven daughters.
 Tehseen Jehan, married in 1940 to Shaukat Sultan, principal of Shibli National College, Azamgarh. She is living in Karachi, Pakistan these days. They have three sons and four daughters.
 Mohsina Sultana, married in 1950 to Amanullah Khan, director of industries, Uttar Pradesh, India. They have four sons and one daughter.
 Momina Sultan, married in 1952 to Captain Khan Sohail Sultan. They have four sons.
 Pakistan Postal Services issued a commemorative postage stamp in his honor in its 'Pioneers of Freedom' series in 1992.

Works
Shamsur Rahman Faruqi, the poet, author, critic and literary theorist argued that Shibli's work has been unjustly dealt with:

Faruqi refuted S. M. Ikram's claim in this regard and subtly highlighted the delicacy of Shibli's thought moulded into his Persian poetry.

Shibli was inspired by the progress of science and education in the West. He wanted to inspire the Muslims to make similar progress by having recourse to their lost heritage and culture, and warned them against getting lost in Western culture. "Ultimately, the Nadwa gave up its notions of uniting occidental and oriental knowledge and concentrated on Islamic scholarship, and on the dissemination of biographical and historical writing in Urdu. Shibli's own writings set the pattern for the latter." In keeping with this goal, he wrote the following books:

 Sirat-un-Nabi (Life of the Holy Prophet) Shibli Nomani started to write this book but he died in 1914, then his student Sulaiman Nadvi took over the responsibility of finishing it and finally completed this book.
 Sirat an-Nu'man
 Al-Faruq , (a biography of the Caliph Omar Farooq)
 Al-Ma'mun
 Al-Ghazali, (a biography of Imam Al-Ghazali)
 Imam Ibn-e-Tamia (Edited by Mohammad Tanzeel-ul-siddiqi al-husaini ),
 Mawlana Rumi (a biography of Mawlana Rumi)
 Aurangzeb Alamgir Par Ek Nazar- a book on the life of Mughal emperor Aurangzeb (1658-1707)
 Sher-ul-ʻAjam, a history of Persian poetry
 "Ilm-Kalam", a history of Muslim theology
 Safar Nama e Rome-o-Misr-o-Sham - a travelogue of Rome, Egypt, Syria and Turkey along with his scholar companion Thomas Walker Arnold in 1892

See also
Hamiduddin Farahi (a student of Shibli Nomani)
Abdul Bari Nadvi  (a student of Shibli Nomani)
Sulaiman Nadvi (a student of Shibli Nomani who later became a scholar and a historian)
Hamiduddin Farahi, in English language- The biographical sketches in the Darul Musannefin Shibli Academy website
Maulana Hamiduddin Farahi, in Urdu language– The biographical sketches in the Darul Musannefin, Shibli Academy website
Muslim Rajputs

References

External links 

Shibli Nomani, the biographical sketches in the Darul Musannefin, Shibli Academy website.
'Life of the Prophet' By Allama Shibli Nu'mani
Mukt Shabd Journal

1857 births
1914 deaths
Hanafis
People from Azamgarh district
Writers from Lucknow
19th-century Indian Muslims
Nadwatul Ulama
Muslim communities of Uttar Pradesh
Darul Uloom Nadwatul Ulama
Urdu-language religious writers
Urdu-language travel writers
Urdu-language writers from British India
20th-century Urdu-language writers
Literary critics of Urdu
Urdu-language theologians
19th-century Indian non-fiction writers
20th-century Indian non-fiction writers
19th-century Indian philosophers
20th-century Indian philosophers
Indian male writers
19th-century Indian male writers
Scholars from Lucknow
Indian travel writers
Deobandis